Chionodes popa is a moth in the family Gelechiidae. It is found in North America, where it has been recorded from California.

The larvae feed on Malacothamnus fasciculatus and Sidalcea malviflora.

References

Chionodes
Moths described in 1999
Moths of North America